Sphingomonas kyeonggiensis  is a Gram-negative bacteria from the genus of Sphingomonas which has been isolated from soil from a ginseng field in Pocheon in Korea.

References

Further reading

External links
Type strain of Sphingomonas kyeonggiensis at BacDive -  the Bacterial Diversity Metadatabase

kaistensis
Bacteria described in 2014